Laurens "Lau" van Ravens (18 September 1922 – 23 October 2018) was a Dutch international football referee, who featured at the 1970 FIFA World Cup. He officiated in the 1950s, 60s and 70s, becoming an international referee in 1966.

He infamously was in charge of the November 1971 European Cup Winners' Cup second leg of the second round match between Glasgow Rangers and Sporting Lisbon. The game originally finished 3-2 to Sporting after 90 minutes, and 4-3 to Sporting after extra time. Although Rangers had won the first leg 3-2 at home, van Ravens erroneously ordered a penalty shootout which Sporting won 3-0; UEFA later ruled that Rangers had won on away goals.

Major matches
Van Ravens refereed two European Cup Finals, the 1969 European Cup Winners' Cup Final between Slovan Bratislava and FC Barcelona of Spain in Basel, and the second leg of the 1972 UEFA Cup Final between Wolverhampton Wanderers and Tottenham Hotspur.

He was also in charge of the 1967 and 1971 KNVB Cup finals and both finalists of the 1971 final requested van Ravens to also lead the replay after he was in charge of the first match which ended 2-2.

At the 1970 World Cup, van Ravens officiated the First Round Match between West Germany and Morocco as well as the quarter-finals match between the Soviet Union and Uruguay. He started the second half of the former match not realizing that the Moroccan goalkeeper had not entered the pitch yet and he mistakenly approved Uruguay's winning goal in the latter match.

His final game was Coen Moulijn's farewell match between Feyenoord and Uruguay on 9 June 1972.

Personal life
Van Ravens worked as a salesman for the Oranjeboom brewing company and was married twice. He had two children. He died in Rijswijk, the Netherlands, aged 96.

References

1922 births
2018 deaths
People from Schiedam
Dutch football referees
1970 FIFA World Cup referees
UEFA Europa League referees